Chowdhary Zulfkar Ali is an Indian politician and former cabinet minister of Jammu and Kashmir. He is an Advocate by profession and was part of the 11th and 12th Jammu and Kashmir Legislative Assembly from Darhal constituency. He is a second-generation politician whose father Chowdhary Mohmmad Hussain was a renowned politician in the erstwhile state of Jammu and Kashmir. Zulfkar has also served as Cabinet Minister under the Chief Ministership of Mufti Mohammad Sayeed and Mehbooba Mufti 2015 to 2018. He was associated with Jammu and Kashmir Peoples Democratic Party and served as district chief of the party for district Rajouri 2003 to 2013. He resigned from the PDP and became one of the founding member of Jammu and Kashmir Apni Party. Presently Vice President of the party. Ali has been Honoured with Best Legislature 2012. As a Cabinet Minister, Ali headed various portfolios. Zulfkar also implemented the national food security act (NFSA) in the state and launched a food for poor scheme (MMSFES).

Personal life 
Zulfkar was born on 1 January 1970 at Tralla, Rajouri to a well-known bureaucrat turned politician Chowdhary Mohmmad Hussain, who belongs to a feudal Zaildar family of the district Rajouri who was a member of Jammu and Kashmir Legislative assembly for 5 terms. Mohmmad Hussain has also served as a minister under the chief ministership of Sheikh Muhammad Abdullah and Dr Farooq Abdullah. Zulfkar did early schooling from MIER Jammu and Graduation from Prince of Wales College Jammu and bachelors in law and masters in law from University of Jammu and masters in business administration (MBA) from IGNOU. He also did a post-graduate diploma course in Journalism and mass communication, industrial relation personal management, human resources development, business administration and rural development. He is married to Ms Zubeida, daughter of a renowned politician Haji Buland Khan who also served as a member of Jammu and Kashmir Legislative assembly and council.

Political career 
Zulfkar was active in politics as a student leader and was a president of the student union in University of Jammu. As his father was associated with Jammu and Kashmir national conference after completing his education he joined Jammu and Kashmir national conference and became the zonal president of the youth wing of the party. In 2002, he was denied a ticket by the national conference from the darhal assembly segment and he contested as a rebel national conference candidate in the 2002 general assembly election and lost with a narrow margin. On 5 January 2003, he joined Jammu and Kashmir people democratic party under the leadership of Mufti Mohammad Sayeed and became the district president which he held for a decade in 2008 general election, he again contested the election from the same segment on the PDP Mandidate and was elected to the 11th J&K legislative assembly from 2008 to 2014, he introduced several important legislation, bills resolutions and issues of general public importance in the Jammu and Kashmir assembly. He also served as a member of the Public Accounts Committee, estimates committee, public undertakings committee, subordinate legislation committee, environment committee etc. and also served as chairman of ethics committee, subordinate legislation committee, and brick klin committee. He was given certificate of appreciation by Jammu and Kashmir legislative assembly for his maiden year 2009 in the assembly. His two brother-in-Law Ajaz Ahmed Khan & Mumtaz Ahmed Khan were members of Jammu & Kashmir Legislative Assembly. In the 2014 general election, he had been reelected to the 12th Jammu and Kashmir legislative assembly and was inducted as a cabinet minister in the PDP-BJP coalition government and was re-inducted as the cabinet minister headed by Mehbooba Mufti.

Constituency 
Chowdhary Zulfkar Ali represented Darhal (vidhan sabha) constituency for a decade from 2008 to November 2018. The constituency is located in the district Rajouri of Jammu province in the lap of PirPangal, having total population of 162540, out of which 86025 are male and 76515 are females with 1543 Schedule caste and 80882 are Schedule tribes (census 2011), the area is tough and mountainous spreading over 100 km2 from Plangarg Thanamandi to Dandote Budhal. Chowdhary Zulfkar transformed the constituency in many ways including the establishment of medical colleges, institutes of higher and high learning including colleges, high and higher secondary schools besides establishment of hundreds of primary and elementary schools, a huge educational infrastructure was set up in the area during the period, besides he ensured 100% electrification of the area with thousands of new poles and new power sub stations were set up. He also focused during the time to ensure 100% rural Road connectivity to every village of the constituency and achieve the target. He got established of additional districts for kotranka, several major developmental works were initiated in the area costing several hundred crores including Anas irrigation project with tunnel, kotranka khawas road, Budhal Shopian Road, degree college kotranka, government medical college at Mera Rajouri, 3 dozen high and higher secondary schools, food for poor under NFSA about 90% of the population covered under PHH category, Rajouri Kandi Budhal double lane road, the establishment of eid gah at kotranka and several tourist spots and establishment of gujjar hostel at kotranka.

Positions held in J&K government 

 Cabinet Minister for Food Civil Supplies and Consumer Affairs
 Cabinet Minister for Tribal Affairs Department (Pioneer Minister)
 Cabinet Minister for Information and Public Relations Department
 Cabinet Minister for Haj and Aquaf Department
 Cabinet Minister for Education Department
 Chairman of State Consumer Council
 Chairman of Ethics Committee
 Chairman of Subordinate Legislation Committee
 Chairman of Brick Kiln Committee( Environment Committee)

Awards and honors 

 He was awarded by several awards and honors by different organisation in recognition of his outstanding services to societies both nationally as well as internationally.

Publications 

 Research work on center-state relations under article 356 of constitution of India with special reference to article 370.
 Working on PanchaytiRaj institutions in India.
 Condition of child labour and overview.

Social life 
He is president and chairman of CMH educational society and CMH group of colleges, working for the spread of education in the state of Jammu and Kashmir and upliftment of the weaker section of the society particularly the down trodden and Tribals

References

External links 
 mobile.twitter.com/chzulfkarali/
https://www.instagram.com/chowdharyzulfkar/
 https://mobile.twitter.com/zulfkaroffice

1970 births
Jammu and Kashmir MLAs 2008–2014
Jammu and Kashmir MLAs 2014–2018
People from Rajouri district
University of Jammu alumni
Apni Party politicians
Living people
Jammu and Kashmir Peoples Democratic Party politicians
Jammu & Kashmir National Conference politicians
Indian lawyers